Foundations and Trends in Computer Graphics and Vision is a journal published by Now Publishers. It publishes survey and tutorial articles on all aspects of computer graphics and vision. The editor-in-chiefs are Brian Curless (University of Washington), Luc Van Gool (KU Leuven) and Richard Szeliski (Microsoft Research).

Abstracting and indexing 
The journal is abstracted and indexed in:
 Inspec
 EI-Compendex
 Scopus
 CSA databases
 ACM Digital Library

External links 
 

Computer science journals
Now Publishers academic journals
English-language journals
Quarterly journals
Publications established in 2007